Sahyadri Hospitals is a chain of hospitals in Maharashtra, India.

History
Sahyadri Hospital was founded by Dr. Charudatt Apte, a neurosurgeon, who serves as its chairman and managing director. The first hospital was established at Deccan Gymkhana Pune, in 2004. As of 2019, the chain has eight network hospitals with over nine hundred beds. They had their first dedicated facility for neurology and neurosurgery treatment at their flagship hospital in the Deccan Gymkhana in November 2004.

Hospitals
The Sahyadri group has eight hospitals with more than 900 beds and 200 ICU beds.
Pune
Sahyadri Super Speciality Hospital, Deccan Gymkhana
Sahyadri Hospital Bibwewadi
Sahyadri Super Speciality Hospital Hadapsar
Sahyadri Hospital Kothrud
Sahyadri Super Speciality Hospital, Nagar Road
Sahyadri Speciality Labs, Lokmanya Colony, Kothrud.
Karad
Sahyadri Super Specialty Hospital Karad
Nashik
Sahyadri Super Speciality Hospital, Nashik

Current facilities

Sahyadri Hospital – Deccan Gymkhana 
Sahyadri Super Speciality Hospital, Deccan Gymkhana is a private hospital in Pune, Maharashtra. It is a 202-bed hospital. It offers services which include cardiology, orthopaedic, organ transplant, general surgery, oncology, internal medicine, paediatrics, and radiology. Pune’s first Covid-era heart transplant was on a 49-year-old woman, performed by Dr Manoj Durairaj and team.

Sahyadri Hospital – Nagar Road 
Sahyadri Super Speciality Hospital, Nagar Road is a  multi-speciality tertiary care NABH accredited hospital. It has 130 beds. It is a multi-speciality and supra-speciality hospital including a state-of-the-art cath lab, IVF lab, well-equipped ICU and CCU as well as NICU.
It is supported by a NABL-accredited lab, diagnostic and imaging services like CT scan, MRI, digital X-ray, stress test, colour Doppler and sonography.

Sahyadri Hospital – Hadapsar 
Sahyadri Super Speciality Hospital, Hadapsar is a multi-specialty tertiary care hospital. The 150-bed hospital serves its surrounding areas such as Magarpatta City, Amnora Township, and densely populated areas of Hadapsar, Kharadi and Wagholi. Situated on the Solapur Highway, it provides easy access.

The hospital provides 24-hour emergency and critical care supported by a fully equipped pathology lab, radiology and a round the clock pharmacy.

Sahyadri Hospital, Hadapsar provides chemotherapy, surgical oncology, radiation oncology, surgical care – neurosurgery, general surgery, orthopaedics, urology, ophthalmology, ENT; and medical services such as gastroenterology, internal medicine, obstetrics and gynaecology, paediatrics and neurology.

Sahyadri Hospital – Kothrud 
Sahyadri Super Speciality Hospital, Kothrud, is a 31-bed hospital with a combination of comfort and care, seamlessly integrated with quaternary health care at Sahyadri Super Speciality Hospital – Deccan Gymkhana.

This hospital is ideal for primary and secondary health care; where one doesn't have to encounter high-tech ultra modern equipment, labyrinthine corridors, cumbersome procedures and paper work.

Sahyadri Hospital – Bibwewadi 
Sahyadri Super Speciality Hospital, Bibwewadi is a 35-bed unit which houses 8 ICU beds and forms one of the vital spokes in the Sahyadri Group of Hospitals. It has all basic facilities for a secondary care multispecialty hospital. The hospital caters to other specialities like internal medicine, orthopaedics, gynaecology and obstetrics, paediatrics, general surgery, urology vascular surgery, cardiology and gastroenterology.

Sahyadri Hospital –  Kasba Peth 
Surya Sahyadri Hospital, Kasba Peth is a multifaculty 65-bed hospital along with trauma care. It is a centrally located hospital providing medical care under one roof with a burn centre, the only one of its kind.

Sahyadri Hospital - Nashik 
Sahyadri is a state-of-the-art multispeciality tertiary care hospital which opened in April 2014 for residents of Nashik and nearing towns like Sangamner, Sinnar, Satana, Malegaon, Amalner, Ghoti, Yeola, Deola and Vani. This large 132-bed hospital provides all medical specialities and super-specialities.

Sahyadri Hospital - Karad 
Spread over about 100,000 sq ft area, this is a full-fledged tertiary care multi-speciality hospital in Southern Maharashtra. It has an imposing four-storey, twin building, strategically located on the Pune – Bangalore Highway at Karad about 175 km from Pune. 

The hospital caters to the healthcare needs of people in Satara, Sangli and Kolhapur districts. It houses 150 beds, providing access to the best of speciality and superspeciality medical services.

Sahyadri Hospital - Karad is the only centre of excellence in the Satara District for in vitro fertilization (IVF) and joint replacement. It also boasts of expertise in minimal invasive or endoscopic / laparoscopic surgeries, cardiology services - cardiac angiographies and angioplasties, neurosurgery and multitrauma. The Radiology Department has Siemens Multi Slice Somatom, Sensation 16 for non-invasive coronary and carotid angiographies.

References

External links
 

Hospital networks in India
Hospitals in Maharashtra
2004 establishments in Maharashtra
Indian companies established in 2004